This list of table tennis players is alphabetically ordered by surname. The main source of the information included in this page is the official International Table Tennis Federation (ITTF) database. More detailed information about their careers is available in the individual players' articles, and in the ITTF database.

Inclusion criteria
Only table tennis players included in the ITTF database who achieved at least one medal in one of the considered competitions can be listed here. A picture of players who achieved an Olympic gold medal in a single event is shown.

Other included information
The name of each player is preceded by the flag of all the countries for which the player has competed. Each player is listed with their achievements in the single event of the considered competitions.  Members of the ITTF Hall of Fame are listed in bold.

Considered competitions and achievements
The considered competitions and the related achievements to be listed in this page are:
 Olympic Games: gold, silver, and bronze medals in single events 
 World Table Tennis Championships: gold medal in single events 
 Table Tennis World Cup: gold medal in single events 
 Table Tennis European Championships: gold medal in single events 
 Asian Table Tennis Championships: gold medal in single events

Player index

A
  Ruth Aarons: winner of World Championships in 1936, 1937
   Fliura Abbate-Bulatova: winner of European Championships in 1988
  Ahn Jae-Hyung
  Maria Alexandru-Golopenta: winner of European Championships in 1966
  Hans Alsér: winner of European Championships in 1962, 1970
  Ivan Andreadis
  Skylet Andrew
  Tiago Apolónia
  Mikael Appelgren: winner of World Cup in 1983; winner of European Championships in 1982, 1988, 1990
  Atanda Musa

B
  Otilia Badescu: winner of European Championships in 2003
  Bao Guio Wong Bik Yiu: winner of Asian Championships in 1954
   Viktor Barna: winner of World Championships in 1930, 1932, 1933, 1934, 1935
  Chester Barnes
  Csilla Batorfi: winner of European Championships in 1986
  Patrick Baum
   Laszlo Bellak
  Stellan Bengtsson: winner of World Championships in 1971; winner of European Championships in 1972
  Ulf Bengtsson: winner of European Championships in 1984
  Zoltan Berczik:  winner of European Championships in 1958, 1960
   Richard Bergmann: winner of World Championships in 1937, 1939, 1947, 1950
  Buddy Blattner
  Timo Boll: winner of World Cup in 2002, 2005; winner of European Championships in 2002, 2007, 2008, 2010, 2011, 2012, 2018
   Tamara Boroš

C
  Cai Zhenhua: winner of Asian Championships in 1982
  Hugo Calderano: bronze medalist at the 2014 Youth Olympic Games, two-time Pan American Games champion
  Cao Yanhua: winner of World Championships in 1983, 1985; winner of Asian Championships in 1978, 1982
  Cao Zhen
  Ulf Carlsson
   Chen Jing: Olympic gold medal at Seoul 1988; Olympic silver medal at Atlanta 1996; Olympic bronze medal at Sydney 2000
  Chen Longcan: winner of World Cup in 1986; winner of Asian Championships in 1988
  Chen Pao-Poe: winner of Asian Championships in 1953
  Chen Qi
   Chen Weixing
   Chen Xinhua: winner of World Cup in 1985
  Chen Zihe
  Chiang Peng-Lung: winner of Asian Championships in 2000
  Patrick Chila
  Choi Kyong Ja: winner of Asian Championships in 1957
  Chuang Chih-Yuan

D

  Dang Ye-Seo
  Deng Yaping: Olympic gold medal at Barcelona 1992; Olympic gold medal at Atlanta 1996; winner of World Championships in 1991, 1995, 1997; winner of World Cup in 1996; winner of Asian Championships in 1994
  Vlasta Depetrisova: winner of World Championships in 1939
  Ding Ning: Olympic gold medal at Rio 2016; Olympic silver medal at London 2012; winner of World Championships in 2011, 2015 and 2017; winner of World Cup in 2011, 2014 and 2018; winner of Asian Championships in 2009
  Ding Song
  Daniela Dodean
  Žarko Dolinar
  Desmond Douglas

E
  Tomie Edano: winner of Asian Championships in 1974
  Fujie Eguchi: winner of World Championships in 1957
   Alojzy Ehrlich
  Helen Elliot
  Silvija Erdelji

F
   Oxana Fadeeva
  Fan Ying
  Fan Zhendong
  Fang Bo
  Gizella Farkas: winner of World Championships in 1947, 1948, 1949
  Jasna Fazlic
  Feng Tianwei: Olympic bronze medal at London 2012
  Steffen Fetzner
  Marcos Freitas
  Naoko Fukazu: winner of World Championships in 1965
  Ai Fukuhara

G
  Andrej Gacina
   Svetlana Ganina
  Gao Jun
  Jean-Philippe Gatien: Olympic silver medal at Barcelona 1992; winner of World Championships in 1993; winner of World Cup in 1994
  Ge Xinai: winner of World Championships in 1979
  Gabor Gergely: winner of European Championships in 1978
  Panagiotis Gionis
  Sandor Glancz
  Qianhong Gotsch-He: winner of European Championships in 2000
  Andrzej Grubba: winner of World Cup in 1988
   Slobodan Grujić 
  Daniela Guergueltcheva: winner of European Championships in 1990
  Guo Yan: winner of World Cup in 2006, 2010; winner of Asian Championships in 2012
  Guo Yue: Olympic bronze medal at Beijing 2008; winner of World Championships in 2007
  Guo Yuehua: winner of World Championships in 1981, 1983; winner of World Cup in 1980, 1982; winner of Asian Championships in 1978

H
  Nobuhiko Hasegawa: winner of World Championships in 1967; winner of Asian Championships in 1967, 1970, 1972, 1974
  Hao Shuai
  Vilim Harangozo
   He Zhili: winner of World Championships in 1987; winner of Asian Championships in 1984, 1986, 1988, 1996
  John Hilton: winner of European Championships in 1980
  Miu Hirano: winner of the Women's World Cup in 2016, the first non-Chinese player to win the title
  Sayaka Hirano
  Hong Cha-Ok
  Mirjam Hooman-Kloppenburg
  Hugo Hoyama
  Hu Melek
  Hu Yulan: winner of World Championships in 1973
  Wenguan Johnny Huang
  Hyun Jung-Hwa: Olympic bronze medal at Barcelona 1992; winner of World Championships in 1993

I
  Kasumi Ishikawa
  Kazuko Ito-Yamaizumi: winner of Asian Championships in 1960
  Shigeo Itoh: winner of World Championships in 1969

J
  Roland Jacobi: winner of World Championships in 1926
   Jiang Huajun
  Jiang Jialiang: winner of World Championships in 1985, 1987; winner of World Cup in 1984; winner of Asian Championships in 1986
  Jiao Zhimin: Olympic bronze medal at Seoul 1988
  Jing Jun Hong
  Kjell Johansson: winner of European Championships in 1964, 1966
  István Jónyer: winner of World Championships in 1975
  Joo Se-Hyuk
  Jung Young-Sik

K

  Zoran Kalinić
  Sharath Kamal: won gold medal at Commonwealth Games in 2006
  Kang Hee-Chan
  Cláudio Kano
    Aleksandar Karakašević 
  Peter Karlsson: winner of European Championships in 2000
  Kazuko Ito-Yamaizumi
  Gerdie Keen
  Istvan Kelen
  Marie Kettnerová: winner of World Championships in 1933, 1935
  Kim Hyang-Mi: Olympic silver medal at Athens 2004
  Kim Ki-Taik: Olympic silver medal at Seoul 1988
  Kim Kyung-Ah: Olympic bronze medal at Athens 2004
  Kim Min-Seok
  Kim Moo-Kyo
  Kim Song-i: Olympic bronze medal at Rio 2016
  Kim Taek-Soo: Olympic bronze medal at Barcelona 1992
  Kim Wan
  Koji Kimura: winner of Asian Championships in 1964
  Seiya Kishikawa
  Tibor Klampár: winner of World Cup in 1981
  Ko Lai Chak
  Eva Koczian: winner of European Championships in 1958, 1960, 1964
  Mitsuru Kohno: winner of World Championships in 1977; winner of Asian Championships in 1968
  Stanislav Kolar: winner of World Championships in 1936
  Kong Linghui: Olympic gold medal at Sydney 2000; winner of World Championships in 1995; winner of World Cup in 1995; winner of Asian Championships in 1994, 1996
  Toshiko Kowada: winner of World Championships in 1969, winner of Asian Championships in 1970
  Kalinikos Kreanga

L
  Lau Sek Fong: winner of Asian Championships in 1957
  Johnny Leach: winner of World Championships in 1949, 1951
  Lee Chul-Seung
  Lee Eun-Sil
  Li Bun-Hui: Olympic bronze medal at Barcelona 1992
  Li Ching
  Li Fen: winner of European Championships in 2013
  Li Furong
  Li Huifen: Olympic silver medal at Seoul 1988
  Li Jiao: winner of European Championships in 2007, 2011
  Li Jiawei
  Li Jie
  Li Ju:  Olympic silver medal at Sydney 2000; winner of World Cup in 2000; winner of Asian Championships in 1998
  Li Li: winner of Asian Championships in 1972
  Li Nan
  Li Ping
  Li Qian

  Li Xiaoxia: Olympic gold medal at London 2012; winner of World Championships in 2013; winner of World Cup in 2008
  Liang Geliang: winner of Asian Championships in 1976
  Lin Huiqing: winner of World Championships in 1971
   Lin Ling: winner of Asian Championships in 2000, 2005
  Erik Lindh: Olympic bronze medal at Seoul 1988
  Liu Guoliang: Olympic gold medal at Atlanta 1996; Olympic bronze medal at Sydney 2000; winner of World Championships in 1999; winner of World Cup in 1996
  Liu Jia: winner of European Championships in 2005
  Liu Shiwen: winner of World Cup in 2009, 2012; winner of Asian Championships in 2013
  Liu Wei
  Lü Lin
   Ilija Lupulesku
   Lyle

M
  Ma Lin: Olympic gold medal at Beijing 2008; winner of World Cup in 2000, 2003, 2004, 2006
  Ma Long: Olympic gold medal at Rio 2016 & Tokyo 2020; winner of Asian Championships in 2009, 2012, 2013; winner of World Cup in 2012, 2015; winner of World Championships in 2015, 2017, 2019
  Ma Wenge: Olympic bronze medal at Barcelona 1992; winner of World Cup in 1989, 1992
  Judit Magos-Havas: winner of European Championships in 1974, 1978
  Mai Văn Hòa: winner of Asian Championships in 1953, 1954
  Kimiyo Matsuzaki: winner of World Championships in 1959, 1963; winner of Asian Championships in 1963
  Adrien Mattenet
  Michael Maze: winner of European Championships in 2009
  James McClure
  Zoltan Mechlovits: winner of World Championships in 1928
  Maria Mednyanszky: winner of World Championships in 1926, 1928, 1929, 1930, 1931
  Erika Metzger
  Jun Mizutani
  Cornelia Molnar
  Martin Monrad
  João Monteiro
  Sachiko Morisawa: winner of World Championships in 1967
  Livia Mossoczy

N
  Gool Nasikwala: winner of Asian Championships in 1952
   Ni Xialian: winner of European Championships in 1998, 2002
  Niu Jianfeng: winner of Asian Championships in 2003
  Koki Niwa: two times world junior champion (2010 doubles, 2011 singles); several silver medals in doubles and in teams sections of the most important competitions

O
  Ichiro Ogimura: winner of World Championships in 1954, 1956; winner of Asian Championships in 1960
  Oh Sang-Eun
  Yukie Ohzeki: winner of Asian Championships in 1968
  Tomie Okawa: winner of World Championships in 1956
  Seiji Ono: winner of World Championships in 1979
  Milan Orlowski: winner of European Championships in 1974
  Dimitrij Ovtcharov: Olympic bronze medal at London 2012, winner of European Championships in 2013

P
  Pak Yung-Sun: winner of World Championships in 1975, 1977
  Park Hae-Jung
  Park Mi-Young
  Jill Parker-Hammersley-Shirley: winner of European Championships in 1976
  Natalia Partyka
  Rūta Paškauskienė: winner of European Championships in 2008
  Veronika Pavlovich
  Viktoria Pavlovich: winner of European Championships in 2010, 2012
  Gordana Perkucin
  Fred Perry: winner of World Championships in 1929
  Jörgen Persson: winner of World Championships in 1991; winner of World Cup in 1991; winner of European Championships in 1986
  Margaryta Pesotska
   Valentina Popova: winner of European Championships in 1980, 1984
  Georgina Póta
  Carl Prean
   Zoran Primorac: winner of World Cup in 1993, 1997
  Gertrude Pritzi: winner of World Championships in 1937, 1938

Q
  Qi Baoxiang: winner of Asian Championships in 1980
  Qiao Hong: Olympic silver medal at Barcelona 1992;  Olympic bronze medal at Atlanta 1996; winner of World Championships in 1989; winner of Asian Championships in 1990
  Qiao Yunping
  Qiu Zhonghui: winner of World Championships in 1961

R

  Rong Guotuan: winner of World Championships in 1959
  Jörg Roßkopf: Olympic bronze medal at Atlanta 1996; winner of World Cup in 1998; winner of European Championships in 1992
  Rosalind Rowe
  Angelica Rozeanu: winner of World Championships in 1950, 1951, 1952, 1953, 1954, 1955
  Zoja Rudnova: winner of European Championships in 1970, 1972
  Tan Ruiwu
  Ryu Ji-Hae
  Ryu Seung-Min: Olympic gold medal at Athens 2004

S

  Jean-Michel Saive: winner of European Championships in 1994
  Elizabeta Samara
  Vladimir Samsonov: winner of World Cup in 1999, 2001, 2009; winner of European Championships in 1998, 2003, 2005
  Hiroji Satoh: winner of World Championships in 1952
  Werner Schlager: winner of World Championships in 2003
   Diane Scholer-Rowe
  Jacques Secrétin: winner of European Championships in 1976
  Masako Seki: winner of Asian Championships in 1964
  Seok Eun-Mi
  Shi Zhihao: winner of Asian Championships in 1980
  Ferenc Sido: winner of World Championships in 1953
    Agnes Simon: winner of European Championships in 1962
  Anna Sipos: winner of World Championships in 1932, 1933
  Kirill Skachkov
  Alexey Smirnov
  Nikoleta Stefanova
  Mihaela Steff
  Antun Stipančić
  Ladislav Stipek
  Nicole Struse: winner of European Championships in 1996
  Suh Sui Cho: winner of Asian Championships in 1952
  Sun Beibei
  Sun Jin
  Dragutin Surbek: winner of European Championships in 1968
  Christian Süß
  Marie Svensson: winner of European Championships in 1994
  Matthew Syed
  Miklos Szabados: winner of World Championships in 1931

T

  Hiroshi Takahashi: winner of Asian Championships in 1963
 Wenling Tan Monfardini
  Toshiaki Tanaka: winner of World Championships in 1955, 1957
   Tang Peng
  Tang Weiyi: winner of Asian Championships in 1992
  Teng Yi: winner of World Cup in 1987
  Tian Yuan
  Tie Yana
  Elena Timina
  Frantisek Tokar
  Bojan Tokic
  Tong Ling: winner of World Championships in 1981
  Krisztina Tóth
  Finn Tugwell

U
  Ilona Uhlikova-Vostova: winner of European Championships in 1968

V
  Bohumil Vana: winner of World Championships in 1938, 1947
  Aljay Villena
  Vera Votrubcova
  Bela Von Kehrling
  Thomas von Scheele
  Bettine Vriesekoop: winner of European Championships in 1982, 1992

W

  Jan-Ove Waldner: Olympic gold medal at Barcelona 1992; Olympic silver medal at Sydney 2000; winner of World Championships in 1989, 1997; winner of World Cup in 1990; winner of European Championships in 1996
  Wang Hao: Olympic silver medal at Athens 2004; Olympic silver medal at Beijing 2008; Olympic silver medal at London 2012; winner of World Championships in 2009; winner of World Cup in 2007, 2008, 2010; winner of Asian Championships in 2003, 2007
  Wang Liqin: Olympic bronze medal at Athens 2004; Olympic bronze medal at Beijing 2008; winner of World Championships in 2001, 2005, 2007; winner of Asian Championships in 1998, 2005
  Wang Nan: Olympic gold medal at Sydney 2000; Olympic silver medal at Beijing 2008; winner of World Championships in 1999, 2001, 2003; winner of World Cup in 1997, 1998, 2003, 2007
  Wang Tao: Olympic silver medal at Atlanta 1996; winner of Asian Championships in 1990
  Wang Yuegu
   Wei Qingguang
   Wu Jiaduo: winner of European Championships in 2009
  Wu Yang

X
  Xi Enting: winner of World Championships in 1973
  Xie Chaojie: winner of Asian Championships in 1992
  Xie Saike: winner of Asian Championships in 1984
  Xu Jie
  Xu Xin
  Xu Yinsheng

Y

  Yan An
  Yan Sen
  Yang Ying
  Yang Young-Ja
  Yoo Nam-Kyu: Olympic gold medal at Seoul 1988
  Yoon Jae-Young
  Yoon Ki-Sook: winner of Asian Championships in 1967
  Kaii Yoshida
  Yu Mengyu
  Yu Sun-Bok

Z
  Ella Zeller
  Zhang Deying
  Zhang Jike: Olympic gold medal at London 2012; winner of World Championships in 2011, 2013; winner of World Cup in 2011
  Zhang Li: winner of Asian Championships in 1976
  Zhang Xielin
  Zhang Yining: Olympic gold medal at Athens 2004; Olympic gold medal at Beijing 2008; winner of World Championships in 2005, 2009; winner of World Cup in 2001, 2002, 2004, 2005; winner of Asian Championships in 2007
  Zhuang Zedong: winner of World Championships in 1961, 1963, 1965

External links 
 Official ITTF webpage
 Official ITTF statistics for complete statistics of each player
 ITTF Museum webpage
 ITTF Museum webpage for the official ITTF hall of fame

References

Table tennis